Diamond Resorts is a timeshare company headquartered in Las Vegas, Nevada, with regional offices in Orlando, Florida and Lancaster, United Kingdom. The company has a network of more than 379 vacation destinations in 35 countries around the world and sells vacation ownership points. The company sponsors numerous celebrities, including LPGA professional Brittany Lincicome, PGA Tour professional Brian Gay and MLB Hall of Famers Gaylord Perry and Reggie Jackson. The company also pairs with country music artists, including Cole Swindell, Lauren Alaina and Jana Kramer to host private concerts for its members.

History

Diamond Resorts launched the Diamond Resorts Invitational in 2013 to benefit Florida Hospital for Children. Through the golf tournament, the company has raised a total of more than $3.1 million to the children's hospital. In March 2018, the company announced it was sponsoring a new golf tournament, the Diamond Resorts Tournament of Champions, with the LPGA as an official season event.

In October 2015, DRI bought out Gold Key Resorts for $167.5 million. This acquisition added five vacation ownership resorts in Virginia Beach, Virginia, and one in the Outer Banks, North Carolina. That same month, Diamond Resorts pledged to match all new donations made to the Diamond Resorts International Foundation, a recognized 501(c)(3) organization, in 2017 up to $1 million to support Hurricane Irma relief efforts.

Diamond Resorts acquired Intrawest Resort Club Group in November 2015, adding nine resorts and 22,000 members. After the acquisition, Diamond Resorts re-branded the Intrawest Resort Club Group as Embarc Resorts.

On June 29, 2016, Apollo Global Management made a successful offer to purchase Diamond Resorts International.

On December 23, 2016 Arizona Attorney General Mark Brnovich announced a settlement of $800,000 with Diamond Resorts. As part of the settlement, customers who bought their timeshares under false pretenses could relinquish them.

Michael Flaskey was named chief executive officer of the company in March 2017.

On January 18, 2018, the company underwent a brand refresh, updating its logo and officially dropping International from its name to be known as Diamond Resorts.

Diamond Resorts announced in March 2018 that the company was partnering with the LPGA to launch the Diamond Resorts Tournament of Champions. The tournament begins the LPGA's 2019 season and features tournament winners from the previous two LPGA seasons, along with celebrity participants. The Diamond Resorts Tournament of Champions replaces the golf tournament the company previously sponsored, the Diamond Resorts Invitational.
That same month, acquired Amber Vacation Club in March 2018 and will assume operations at Amber's managed resorts, Sunrise Ridge Resort in Pigeon Forge, Tennessee and Alhambra Villas and Alhambra at Poinciana in Kissimmee, Florida.

In April 2018, Diamond Resorts announced it had acquired The Modern Honolulu, a boutique hotel in Honolulu, Hawaii.

In January 2020, Diamond Resorts partnered with Highgate to rent units in two properties in New York City.

In March 2021, Apollo Global agreed to sell Diamond Resorts to Hilton Grand Vacations for $1.4 billion. The acquisition was completed on August 2, 2021.

Undercover Boss
The company's founder, Stephen J. Cloobeck, was featured in the fourth season premiere of the American reality television series Undercover Boss on January 15, 2012, marking the first time the head of a company previously featured in an earlier episode went undercover a second time.

Properties

United States

International

Criticism and controversy

Sales tactics 
Diamond Resorts is notable for high-pressure sales tactics used to close sales and generate fees for consumers. Club members are charged yearly maintenance fees (including management fees), which are set by Diamond Resorts and which the FTC warns are likely to rise every year. Diamond Resorts's official 2014 SEC filing states that club members do not have the right to terminate membership, except in certain areas where consumers are protected by state law.  Jeff Weir, a Diamond timeshare owner and journalist covering the timeshare industry, told The New York Times, "In my experience, Diamond is much more ambitious, aggressive and downright nasty in their sales presentations compared to Marriott and Westin. Diamond just has an amazing reputation of being tough on people."

Mike Flaskey, the company's current chief executive officer, spoke on Fox Business about how the company is shaking up its sales and marketing model to better meet traveler's desires.

Legal issues
On December 23, 2016, Arizona Attorney General Mark Brnovich announced a settlement of $800,000 with Diamond Resorts over accusations that Diamond Resorts had violated the Arizona Consumer Fraud Act. Of the settlement funds, $650,000 were used for customer restitution. Under the settlement, customers who had purchased timeshares in Arizona between January 1, 2011, and July 23, 2017, could be released from their timeshare, provided they gave a detailed description of deceptive statements or false promises made by Diamond Resorts employees during the sale.

The Attorney General's website states that alleged misrepresentations were related to:

Similar programs
Bluegreen Corporation
Disney Vacation Club
Hilton Grand Vacations Company
Marriott Vacation Club International
Westgate Resorts
WorldMark by Wyndham
Wyndham Vacation Resorts Asia-Pacific

See also

Diamond Resorts Invitational
Mystic Dunes Golf Club
Great Wolf Resorts

References

External links
 

Timeshare chains
Hospitality companies established in 1992
Hospitality companies of the United States
Companies listed on the New York Stock Exchange
Companies based in Las Vegas